Tabrezi Davlatmir (born 6 June 1998) is a Tajikistani professional football player who plays for Istiklol.

Career

Club
In June 2016, Davlatmir return to FC Istiklol after a loan spell with Barki Tajik.

On 9 February 2021, Istiklol confirmed that Davlatmir had left the club to sign a one-year contract with Estonian Meistriliiga club Narva Trans. In November 2021, with three rounds of the 2021 Season still remaining, Davlatmir left Narva Trans after his work visa had expired.

On 2 March 2022, Istiklol confirmed that Davlatmir would be out for two-months with a knee injury. On 31 March 2022, Istiklol confirmed the signing of Davlatmir.

International
Davlatmir made his senior team debut on 7 July 2016 against Bangladesh.

Career statistics

Club

International

Statistics accurate as of match played 25 September 2022

Honors
Istiklol
 Tajikistan Higher League (6): 2016, 2017, 2018, 2019, 2020, 2022
 Tajik Cup (3): 2016, 2018, 2019
 Tajik Supercup (2): 2018,  2020

Tajikistan
King's Cup: 2022

References

External links
 
 

1998 births
Living people
Tajikistani footballers
Tajikistan international footballers
FC Istiklol players
Association football defenders
Tajikistan Higher League players